Locumba District is one of three districts of the province Jorge Basadre in Peru.

References